The 2017 Challenge Cup Final was the 116th cup-deciding game of the rugby league 2017 Challenge Cup Season. It was held at Wembley Stadium in London on 26 August 2017, kick off 15:00. The final was contested by Hull F.C. and Wigan Warriors. The game saw Hull F.C. beat Wigan by 18 points to 14.

Background
The 2017 Challenge Cup Final marks Wigan Warriors's fifth final of the Super League era and Hull F.C.'s fifth. In addition it is the fourth time the two sides had met in the competition, having met  previously in the 1958–59 Challenge Cup Final, 1984–85 Challenge Cup Final, and 2013 Challenge Cup Final, with the Warriors winning 16–0 in their most recent meeting in addition to winning both finals in the pre-Super League era. Wigan had previously won a record 19 challenge cup finals compared to Hull's four.

Route to the final

Hull F.C.

Hull's sixth round draw saw them nil Catalans Dragons scoring 62 points. The quarter finals saw them beat eventual Super League Grand Finalists Castleford Tigers 32 points to 24. In the semi-final they beat eventual Super League Champions Leeds Rhinos 43 points to 24.

Wigan Warriors

Wigan's sixth round draw saw a comfortable win over Championship side Swinton Lions before a tight win by a single point against local rivals Warrington Wolves. The semi-finals saw a 27 point to 14 victory over fellow Greater Manchester side Salford Red Devils.

Pre-match

Fan zone
The 2017 Challenge Cup Final was the first Challenge Cup Final to have a fan zone before and during the match. The 2,000 capacity fan zone was located outside of Wembley Arena and contained ale and larger bars as well as street food vendors. House music band Conquer Rio performed at the event in addition to a small number of players making an appearance before the match.

Ticketing
Over 20,000 seats in Wembley were priced at under £30 with children's tickets starting at £5. Families of four could attend for £50. All in all, this made the event a relatively cheap sporting fixture in the UK.

Match details

Post-match
Unfortunately for the development of rugby league in the British Isles, the 2017 Challenge Cup Final saw the lowest attendance of the new Wembley era, beginning with the 2007 Final, of only 68,525.

References

Challenge Cup finals
2017 in English rugby league
2017 sports events in London
Hull F.C. matches
Wigan Warriors matches
August 2017 sports events in the United Kingdom